The trifoliate orange, Citrus trifoliata or Poncirus trifoliata, is a member of the family Rutaceae. Whether the trifoliate oranges should be considered to belong to their own genus, Poncirus, or be included in the genus Citrus is debated. The species is unusual among citrus for having deciduous, compound leaves and pubescent (downy) fruit.

It is native to northern China and Korea, and is also known as the Japanese bitter-orange, hardy orange or Chinese bitter orange.

Because of its relative hardiness, citrus grafted onto Citrus trifoliata are usually hardier than when grown on their own roots.

Description
The flowers are white, with pink stamens,  in diameter, larger than those of true citrus but otherwise closely resembling them, except that the scent is much less pronounced than with true citrus. As with true citrus, the leaves give off a spicy smell when crushed.

The fruits also have distinctive smell from other citrus varieties and often contain a high concentration of seeds.

Uses

Cultivation
The cultivar 'Flying Dragon' is dwarfed in size, has highly twisted, contorted stems, and has even stronger thorns than the type. It makes an excellent barrier hedge due to its density and strong curved thorns. Such hedges have been grown for over 50 years at Oklahoma State University in Stillwater, and are highly student-proof. The plant is also highly deer-resistant. In central London, mature specimens of the trifoliate orange can be seen in the gardens of St Paul's Cathedral.

Trifoliate orange and various hybrids of this plant are widely used as citrus rootstock, and valued for their resistance to cold, the tristeza virus, and the fungus Phytophthora parasitica (root rot).

Recent studies have revealed that the trifoliate orange contains auraptene at a high concentration, which is one of the functional components having immunity against citrus tristeza virus (CTV).

As food
The fruits are very bitter, due in part to their poncirin content. Most people consider them inedible fresh, but they can be made into marmalade. When dried and powdered, they can be used as a condiment.

Medicine

Traditional medicine
The fruits of the trifoliate orange are widely used in medical traditions of East Asia as a treatment for allergic inflammation.

Taxonomy
The trifoliate orange was historically considered a member of the genus Citrus until Walter Swingle moved it to its own novel genus, Poncirus, based on its deciduous trifoliate leaves differing from other Citrus, as part of a larger reclassification that split the historical Citrus into seven genera. However, David Mabberley and Dianxiang  Zhang reunited all of Swingle's novel genera back into Citrus.  Early phylogenetic analysis of trifoliate orange plastids nested Poncirus within the citrus, consistent with a single genus, but the sequencing of the nuclear genome by Wu, et al. showed its genome to be most divergent, different enough to justify retention of Poncirus as a separate genus.  To explain the conflict between the plastid and nuclear genomic analysis, it was speculated that the trifoliate orange is likely either the progeny of an ancient hybridization between a core citrus and an unidentified more distant relative, or at some time in its history it acquired an introgressed cpDNA genome from another species.  Ollitrault, Curk and Krueger indicate that the majority of data are consistent with the enlarged Citrus that includes the trifoliate orange, though they recognize that many botanists still follow Swingle.

A second species of trifoliate orange native to Yunnan (China) has been reported and named Poncirus polyandra. Were Poncirus to be subsumed into Citrus, where C. polyandra is unavailable, the name Citrus polytrifolia has been suggested. Zhang and Mabberley concluded this Yunnan cultivar is likely a hybrid between the trifoliate orange and another Citrus, but recent genomic analysis of P. polyandra showed low levels of heterozygosity, the opposite of what one would expect for a hybrid. This analysis dated its divergence from P. trifoliata about 2.82 million years ago.

The trifoliate orange does not naturally interbreed with core Citrus taxa due to different flowering times, but hybrids have been produced artificially between the trifoliate orange and other citrus. In the Swingle system, where the trifoliate orange is placed in Poncirus, a hybrid genus name has been coined for these intra-generic crosses, "× Citroncirus". The most notable of these are the citrange, a cross between the trifoliate and sweet oranges, and the citrumelo, a hybrid of trifoliate orange and 'Duncan' grapefruit. Placing the trifoliate orange in Citrus would mean these hybrids would no longer be intergeneric, but instead hybrids within Citrus.  Genomic analysis of a number of these hybrids showed them all to derive from P. trifoliata and not P. polyandra.

References

Citrus
Flora of China
Flora of Korea
Garden plants of Asia
Medicinal plants
Oranges (fruit)
Fruits originating in East Asia